kmNikulino is a rural locality (a village) in Yudinskoye Rural Settlement, Velikoustyugsky District, Vologda Oblast, Russia. The population was 18 as of 2002.

Geography 
From Nikulino, the town of Veliky Ustyug is roughly three km away. Yudino, the nearest rural locality, is four km away.

References 

Rural localities in Velikoustyugsky District